Matías Ignacio García (born 11 November 1995) is an Argentine professional footballer who plays as a central midfielder for LDU Portoviejo.

Career
García's career began with Argentinos Juniors. He made his senior debut with them in the Copa Argentina against Sportivo Belgrano on 23 March 2013. In July 2017, García joined San Lorenzo. Six months later, without featuring for San Lorenzo, García was loaned to fellow Primera División team Arsenal de Sarandí. He made his professional debut on 18 March 2018 during a draw with Vélez Sarsfield, which was one of three league appearances as they suffered relegation to Primera B Nacional. After returning to his parent club in June 2018, Unión Santa Fe signed García a month later.

García didn't appear in the league for Unión Santa Fe, though did play the full duration of a Copa de la Superliga first round first leg draw away to San Martín on 13 April 2019. In the succeeding August, García headed down to the second tier to play for Chacarita Juniors. He made appearances against Santamarina and Instituto in August and September, prior to departing in January 2020 to Ecuadorian Serie A side LDU Portoviejo. His debut arrived on 16 February during a 2–1 loss away to El Nacional, which preceded seventeen further matches as they suffered relegation via goal difference.

Career statistics
.

References

External links

1995 births
Living people
Footballers from Buenos Aires
Argentine footballers
Argentine expatriate footballers
Expatriate footballers in Ecuador
Argentine expatriate sportspeople in Ecuador
Association football midfielders
Argentine Primera División players
Primera Nacional players
Ecuadorian Serie A players
Argentinos Juniors footballers
San Lorenzo de Almagro footballers
Arsenal de Sarandí footballers
Unión de Santa Fe footballers
Chacarita Juniors footballers
L.D.U. Portoviejo footballers